Iwakura Station (岩倉駅) is the name of several train stations in Japan:

 Iwakura Station (Aichi) in Iwakura, Aichi Prefecture
 Iwakura Station (Kyoto) in Sakyo-ku, Kyoto
 Iwakura Station (Yamaguchi) in Yamaguchi